The High Council of Judges and Prosecutors is a collegial body invested with a preponderant role within the framework of the administration of justice of the Principality of Monaco. The High Council of Judges and Prosecutors was instituted by the law n° 1364 of November 16, 2009 relating to the statute of the magistracy. In November 2018, the new members of the High Judicial Council have been introduced in their new functions, under the chairmanship of Laurent Anselmi, Director of Judicial Services.

Mission 
The High Council's mission is to ensure that fairness, equal treatment and all the principles that a rule of law must respect in the management of magistrates' careers are observed. The High Council is also called upon to exercise disciplinary power with regard to magistrates, the disciplinary procedure being surrounded by reinforced guarantees tending, in particular, to ensure respect for its adversarial nature. The High Council of Magistracy can be consulted by the Prince on any question relating to the organization and functioning of justice.

Composition 
The High Council of Judges and Prosecutors is composed of seven members and acts with no less than five members:

 President - The Secretary of Justice 
 Vice-President - The First President of the Court of Revision
 A full member of the Crown Council
 A full member appointed by the National Council
 A full member appointed by the Supreme Court
 Two members elected by the judges

Members 
As of 2021 the members of the High Council of Judges and Prosecutors are:

Full members 
 Philippe Orengo, appointed by the Crown Council;
 Yves Strickler, appointed by the National Council;
 Dominique Adam, appointed by the Supreme Court;
 Éric Senna, Counselor at the Court of Appeal, elected by the second college of the judiciary;
 Magali Ghenassia, Vice-president at the Court of First Instance, elected by the first college of the judiciary.

Alternate members 

 Laurent Le Mesle, Advisor to the Court of Revision, appointed by the said Court to replace the Vice-president ex officio;
 Olivier Echappe, Counselor at the French Court of Cassation, appointed by the Crown Council;
 Béatrice Bardy, appointed by the National Council;
 Mathieu Disant, Associate Professor of the Faculties of Law, Professor at the University Jean Monnet - Lyon Saint-Étienne, appointed by the Supreme Court;
 Adrien Candau, Judge at the Court of First Instance, elected by the first college of the judiciary;
 Cyrielle Colle, First Substitute of the Attorney General, elected by the second college of the judiciary.

References 

Law enforcement in Monaco
Law of Monaco
2009 establishments in Europe
Judiciaries
Courts and tribunals established in 2009